The 1973 Meath Senior Football Championship is the 81st edition of the Meath GAA's premier club Gaelic football tournament for senior graded teams in County Meath, Ireland. The tournament consists of 15 teams, with the winner going on to represent Meath in the Leinster Senior Club Football Championship. The championship starts with a group stage and then progresses to a knock out stage.

This season saw Summerhill's return to the top flight after claiming the 1972 Meath Intermediate Football Championship title, their 3rd period as a senior club and 3rd season altogether.

Seneschalstown were the defending champions after they defeated Navan O'Mahonys in the previous years final after a replay, however, this season relinquished their crown at the semi-final stage when losing to eventual runners-up Ballivor.

Ballinlough were relegated to the 1974 I.F.C. after losing the Relegation Final to Syddan.

On 7 October 1973, Navan O'Mahonys won their 8th Meath S.F.C. title when they defeated Ballivor 1-9 to 1-7 in the final in Pairc Tailteann. Ronan Giles raised the Keegan Cup for the Hoops.

Team Changes
 

The following teams have changed division since the 1972 championship season.

To S.F.C.
Promoted from I.F.C.
 Summerhill (Intermediate Champions).

From S.F.C.
Regraded to I.F.C.
 St. Vincent's

Group stage

Group A

Round 1:
 Seneschalstown 1-7, 0-6 Trim, Dunshaughlin, 15/4/1973,
 Summerhill 1-8, 1-7 Slane, Skryne, 15/4/1973,
 Dunderry 4-9, 1-5 Gaeil Colmcille, Martry, 15/4/1973,
 Walterstown 0-12, 2-5 Syddan, Kilberry, 15/4/1973,

Round 2:
 Summerhill 3-9, 1-8 Trim, Kildalkey, 29/4/1973,
 Dunderry 2-13, 2-4 Syddan, Kilberry, 29/4/1973,
 Gaeil Colmcille 1-9, 1-5 Walterstown, Martry, 29/4/1973,
 Seneschalstown 1-11, 0-7 Slane, Pairc Tailteann, 13/5/1973,

Round 3:
 Walterstown 2-5, 1-8 Dunderry, Pairc Tailteann, 13/5/1973,
 Gaeil Colmcille w, l Syddan, Gibbstown, 13/5/1973,
 Trim 2-8, 1-5 Slane, Pairc Tailteann, 24/6/1973,
 Seneschalstown 4-13, 1-10 Summerhill, Skryne, 24/6/1973,

Round 4:
 Seneschalstown 1-10, 1-6 Dunderry, Kilberry, 1/7/1973,
 Summerhill 1-12, 1-3 Gaeil Colmcille, Kilmessan, 1/7/1973,
 Walterstown 2-10, 0-4 Slane, Pairc Tailteann, 8/7/1973,
 Trim 2-11, 0-5 Syddan, Martry, 8/7/1973,

Round 5:
 Seneschalstown w, l Syddan, Kilberry, 29/7/1973,
 Summerhill 1-6, 0-9 Walterstown, Dunshaughlin, 29/7/1973,
 Dunderry 1-7, 0-5 Slane, Pairc Tailteann, 29/7/1973,
 Trim 3-8, 2-6 Gaeil Colmcille, Pairc Tailteann, 29/7/1973,

Round 6:
 Seneschalstown w, l Gaeil Colmcille, Dunshaughlin, 5/8/1973,
 Walterstown v Trim, Pairc Tailteann, 19/8/1973,
 Summerhill 1-10, 1-5 Dunderry, Trim, 26/8/1973,
 Slane 2-5, 1-8 Syddan, Kilberry, 26/8/1973,

Round 7:
 Summerhill 2-9, 1-6 Syddan, Pairc Tailteann, 2/9/1973, 
 Slane w, l Gaeil Colmcille,
 Seneschalstown v Walterstown,
 Dunderry v Trim,

Group B

Round 1:
 Duleek 1-8, 1-6 Ballinlough, Kilbride, 1/4/1973,
 Ballivor 2-5, 1-8 Kilbride, Kilmessan, 15/4/1973,
 Navan O'Mahonys 0-11, 1-6 Skryne, Duleek, 15/4/1973,
 St. Patrick's - Bye,

Round 2:
 St. Patrick's 1-13, 2-7 Ballinlough, Pairc Tailteann, 15/4/1973,
 Navan O'Mahonys w, l Ballivor, Trim, 29/4/1973,
 Skryne w, l Kilbride, Dunshaughlin, 29/4/1973,
 Duleek - Bye,

Round 3:
 Duleek w, l St. Patrick's, Seneschalstown, 29/4/1973,
 Navan O'Mahonys 1-6, 0-4 Kilbride, Kilmessan, 13/5/1973,
 Ballivor 2-8, 1-3 Skryne, Trim, 13/5/1973,
 Ballinlough - Bye,

Round 4:
 Duleek 4-8, 4-6 Kilbride, Skryne, 10/6/1973,
 Navan O'Mahonys 2-13, 1-4 Ballinlough, Martry, 24/6/1973,
 St. Patrick's 2-8, 1-8 Skryne, Seneschalstown, 24/6/1973,
 Ballivor - Bye,

Round 5:
 Skryne 0-18, 0-6 Duleek, Seneschalstown, 8/7/1973,
 Navan O'Mahonys 0-13, 0-2 St. Patrick's, Duleek, 8/7/1973,
 Ballivor w/o, scr Ballinlough, Athboy, 8/7/1973,
 Kilbride - Bye,

Round 6:
 Ballivor 1-7, 1-7 St. Patrick's, Dunshaughlin, 5/8/1973,
 Navan O'Mahonys 1-12, 1-8 Duleek, Skryne, 5/8/1973,
 Kilbride w/o, scr Ballinlough,
 Skryne - Bye,

Round 7:
 Ballivor w, l Duleek, Dunshaughlin, 26/8/1973,
 Skryne w/o, scr Ballinlough,
 Kilbride w, l St. Patrick's,
 Navan O'Mahonys - Bye,

Knock-out Stages

Relegation final
 Syddan 2-14, 1-5 Ballinlough, Kells, 30/9/1973,

Finals
The winners and runners up of each group qualify for the semi-finals.

Semi-finals:
 Ballivor 0-14, 2-6 Seneschalstown, Pairc Tailteann, 9/9/1973,
 Navan O'Mahonys 1-6, 1-6 Summerhill Pairc Tailteann, 16/9/1973,
 Navan O'Mahonys 3-4, 0-9 Summerhill, Trim, 30/9/1973

Final:
 Navan O'Mahonys 1-9, 1-7 Ballivor, Pairc Tailteann, 7/10/1973,

Leinster Senior Club Football Championship

Preliminary round:
 Cooley Kickhams w, l Navan O'Mahonys, ???, 11/11/1973,

References

External links

Meath Senior Football Championship
Meath Senior Football Championship